In numerical analysis, Halley's method is a root-finding algorithm used for functions of one real variable with a continuous second derivative. It is named after its inventor Edmond Halley.

The algorithm is second in the class of Householder's methods, after Newton's method. Like the latter, it iteratively produces a sequence of approximations to the root; their rate of convergence to the root is cubic. Multidimensional versions of this method exist.

Halley's method exactly finds the roots of a linear-over-linear Padé approximation to the function, in contrast to Newton's method or the Secant method which approximate the function linearly, or Muller's method which approximates the function quadratically.

Method
Edmond Halley was an English mathematician who introduced the method now called by his name. Halley's method is a numerical algorithm for solving the nonlinear equation f(x) = 0. In this case, the function f has to be a function of one real variable. The method consists of a sequence of iterations:

beginning with an initial guess x0.

If f is a three times continuously differentiable function and a is a zero of f but not of its derivative, then, in a neighborhood of a, the iterates xn satisfy:

This means that the iterates converge to the zero if the initial guess is sufficiently close, and that the convergence is cubic.

The following alternative formulation shows the similarity between Halley's method and Newton's method. The expression  is computed only once, and it is particularly useful when  can be simplified:

When the second derivative is very close to zero, the Halley's method iteration is almost the same as the Newton's method iteration.

Derivation
Consider the function

Any root of f which is not a root of its derivative is a root of g; and any root r of g must be a root of f provided the derivative of f at r is not infinite. Applying Newton's method to g gives

with

and the result follows. Notice that if f′ (c) = 0, then one cannot apply this at c because g(c) would be undefined.

Cubic convergence
Suppose a is a root of f but not of its derivative. And suppose that the third derivative of f exists and is continuous in a neighborhood of a and xn is in that neighborhood. Then Taylor's theorem implies:

and also

where ξ and η are numbers lying between a and xn.

Canceling  and re-organizing terms yields:

Put the second term on the left side and divide through by

to get:

Thus:

If we take K to be a little larger than the absolute value of this, we can take absolute values of both sides of the formula and replace the absolute value of coefficient by its upper bound near a to get:

which is what was to be proved.

To summarize,

References

External links
 
 Newton's method and high order iterations, Pascal Sebah and Xavier Gourdon, 2001 (the site has a link to a Postscript version for better formula display)

Root-finding algorithms